The Wild Thornberrys is an American animated television series created by Arlene Klasky, Gábor Csupó, Steve Pepoon, David Silverman, and Stephen Sustarsic and produced by Klasky Csupo for Nickelodeon. The show focuses on the Thornberrys, a family of nature documentarians headed by Nigel Thornberry, a British filmmaker, and his wife, camera operator Marianne. Their daughters, Debbie and Eliza, join them in their quest to research animals in their natural habitats across the world. The Thornberrys travel around the world in the ComVee, a recreational vehicle equipped with survival gear, which also serves as the Thornberry home while they are on an expedition. Their travel companions also include Donnie, a ferral boy whom the Thornberrys adopted, and Darwin, a skittish chimpanzee. Eliza, the younger of the two sisters, has a magical ability to communicate with animals, the origin of which is explained in the season 2 episode "Gift of Gab".

The series premiered on September 1, 1998, and ran for 5 seasons with 91 episodes. The series finale aired on June 11, 2004. Unlike typical Nickelodeon series of the time, each episode is a full half-hour in length (22 minutes if not counting commercials). Along with the feature film The Wild Thornberrys Movie, the characters have also been featured in Rugrats Go Wild, a feature film crossover with another popular Klasky Csupo production, Rugrats.

Series overview

Episodes

Pilot (1998)

Season 1 (1998–99)

Season 2 (1999–2000)

Season 3 (2000–01)

Season 4 (2001–02)

Season 5 (2003–04)

Films (2002–03)

References

External links
 

Wild Thornberrys
The Wild Thornberrys
Wild Thornberrys